Tomelilla Municipality (Tomelilla kommun) is a municipality in Skåne County in southern Sweden. Its seat is located in the town Tomelilla.

The municipality was formed through a series of amalgamations taking place in 1952, 1969 and 1971. The number of pre-1952 units making up the present municipality is twenty.

Geography
Tomelilla Municipality is located in the south-eastern plains of Scania known as Österlen, which is an area notable for its beauty, and thus popular among painters as well as covered with summer cottages, country mansions, and so on.

Localities
There were seven localities in the municipality in 2018.

Notability
Tomelilla Municipality was made famous by Tage Danielsson (1928–1985) and Hans Alfredsson (1931-), who directed and acted in numerous movies that were filmed in and around the town of Tomelilla:

 The Apple War (1972)
 Ägget är löst (1975)
 Picassos äventyr (1978)
 Den enfaldige mördaren (1982)
 P&B (1983)
 Jim & piraterna Blom (1986)

The following notable people live in Tomelilla:

Hans Alfredson (director/actor)
Gösta Ekman (actor)
Ulf Lundell (singer)
Gudrun Schyman (politician)

Tomelilla Municipality is known for the amusement park Tosselilla Summer Park, possibly the most visited amusement park in the province, and the Hallamölla waterfall.

Its coat of arms is from 2002. It depicts the bird kite, native to the area, in silver on a red shield.

References
Statistics Sweden

External links

Tomelilla - Official site
Österlen - Official site

Municipalities of Skåne County